Gelechia arotrias is a moth of the family Gelechiidae. It is found in South Africa, where it has been recorded from KwaZulu-Natal.

The wingspan is about 21 mm. The forewings are dark purplish-fuscous, lighter and crimson-tinged towards the base of the costa, darkest above the dorsal stripe. There is a pale ochreous-yellowish dorsal stripe from the base to near the tornus, rather broad towards the middle but narrowed to the extremities, before the posterior extremity emitting an oblique bar to two-thirds of the disc. The hindwings are rather light fuscous, somewhat darker posteriorly.

References

Endemic moths of South Africa
Moths described in 1908
Gelechia